Stephen Brown Allen (born January 12, 1950) is a maker of Latter-day Saint religious and proselytizing films.

Allen was born in Salt Lake City, Utah, to Arthur Tranter and Virginia Brown Allen. His mother died from complications related to childbirth and his father subsequently married June Fowler Allen, the only mother he would know. His father was involved in the Church of Jesus Christ of Latter-day Saints (LDS Church) building program. On assignments, his family moved to various parts of the world. Allen spent four years of his childhood in Australia and New Zealand. At the age of twelve his family moved to Montevideo, Uruguay, where he later graduated from high school.

Allen served as a missionary in the church's Guatemala–El Salvador Mission from 1969 to 1971.  He then attended Brigham Young University where he graduated with a major in Communications—Television Production and a minor in Advertising and Public Relations.

He married Nancy Billings on January 28, 1972, in the Salt Lake Temple. They have six children—four boys and two girls. All six children have served missions. The Allens now have 25 grandchildren.

Allen served as president of the church's Arizona Tempe Mission from 1993 to 1995. He has served as a bishop twice, counselor in a stake presidency, and stake president.

Prior to his call as a mission president, Allen was the director of Media and Public Programs in the church's Missionary Department. He was responsible for the production and distribution of radio, television, and print media directed to nonmembers as well as the church's pageants, visitors' centers, and historic sites. Earlier in his career, Allen was the executive producer of the LDS Church's Homefront radio and television commercials and many other church films, including Mr. Krueger's Christmas (1980) and The Last Leaf (1983).

Following his service as a mission president in Arizona, Allen served as managing director of the church's Missionary Department for 18 years until he retired in February 2017. Concurrent with his service in the church's Missionary Department, Allen served from 2011 to 2016 as an area seventy in the Fifth Quorum of Seventy, assigned to the Utah Salt Lake City Area. From 2018 to 2020, Allen served as director of the Laie Hawaii Temple Visitors' Center.

Key projects

Ad campaigns 

Emmy Award-Winning Homefront PSAs, I'm a Mormon

Films
Mr. Krueger's Christmas (1980)
The Last Leaf (1983)
Man's Search for Happiness (1987 Remake)
The Nativity: Luke II (1986)
Together Forever (1987)

Allen as LDS Church spokesman 
Following are quotes by Allen published in news media:

In an article chronicling The LDS Church winning its 2nd Emmy for the Homefront public service announcement campaign, Allen said, "The Emmy doesn't fit in a suitcase," he explained. "Carrying it out of the banquet room, back to the hotel and on the plane - it didn't go unnoticed. We heard whispers and 'oohs' everywhere we went. It was surprising how many people recognized the Emmy."
"We're not secretive," Stephen B. Allen, managing director of the church's missionary department, who is in charge of the [I'm a Mormon] campaign, said in an interview. "And we're not scared of what people think of us. If you don't recognize the problem, you can't solve the problem. If nobody tells you you have spinach in your teeth, how would you know?"
"I'll never forget this one woman, said Stephen B. Allen, managing director of the church's missionary program. When participants were asked how they would feel about doing community service with Mormons, "She said — Allen adopted a stage whisper — "if you are serving alongside them, you can ask them the questions you always wanted to ask." [The I'm a Mormon Campaign's] principal purpose, Allen said, is to "dispel the myths and misperceptions about Mormons, a critical task for a religion that considers proselytizing an ecclesiastical mandate. "Our motivator was, how do we help these young missionaries who are donating two years of their time and paying their own way and working their guts out overcome some of the obstacles, so they can share their message more openly? said Allen in an interview in his Temple Square office last week.

References

External links 
 
 

1950 births
20th-century Mormon missionaries
American Mormon missionaries in the United States
American leaders of the Church of Jesus Christ of Latter-day Saints
American Mormon missionaries in Guatemala
American Mormon missionaries in El Salvador
Area seventies (LDS Church)
Living people
Mission presidents (LDS Church)
American filmmakers
Spokespersons
American expatriates in Uruguay
Filmmakers from Utah
People from Salt Lake City